Daniel O'Day (1870–1916) was an American oil refiner.

Daniel O'Day may also refer to:
 Daniel O'Day (banker) (1844–1906), father of the above; American banker and oil refiner. 
 Daniel O'Day III (1906–1999), grandson of the above.